Beauties on Motor Scooters (Italian: Bellezze in moto-scooter) is a 1952 Italian comedy film by Carlo Campogalliani and starring Isa Barzizza, Virginia Belmont and Fulvia Franco.

Partial cast
 Isa Barzizza as Laura 
 Virginia Belmont as Enrichetta 
 Fulvia Franco as Marcella 
 Carlo Giustini as Alberto 
 Enrico Viarisio as Carletti 
 Linda Sini as Franca 
 Guglielmo Inglese as Pelacardi 
 Galeazzo Benti as Gastone 
 Riccardo Billi 
 Tony Amendola  
 Maria Fiore 
 Maurizio Arena 
 Mario Riva 
 Tazio Nuvolari    
 Virgilio Riento 
 Renato Malavasi  
 Enrico Luzi

References

Bibliography
 Daniela Treveri Gennari. Post-War Italian Cinema: American Intervention, Vatican Interests. Routledge, 2011.

External links
 

1952 films
1950s Italian-language films
Italian comedy films
1952 comedy films
Films directed by Carlo Campogalliani
Films with screenplays by Mario Amendola
Italian black-and-white films
1950s Italian films